Janvier Charles Mbarga (born September 27, 1985 in Yaoundé, Cameroon) is a professional Cameroonian footballer who plays as goalkeeper.

Career
Mbarga began his career with Canon Yaoundé and was 2007 promoted to the senior team, in September 2009 signed for Cotonsport Garoua.

References

External links

1985 births
Living people
Cameroonian footballers
Canon Yaoundé players
FC Botoșani players
Union Douala players
Association football goalkeepers